The Myinsaing Kingdom was the kingdom that ruled central Burma (Myanmar) from 1297 to 1313. It was founded by three brothers from Myinsaing, and was one of many small kingdoms that emerged following the collapse of Pagan Empire in 1287. Myinsaing successfully fended off the second Mongol invasion in 1300–01, and went on to unify central Burma from Tagaung in the north to Prome (Pyay) in the south. The brothers' co-rule ended between 1310 and 1313, with the death of the two elder brothers. In 1315, the central Burmese state split into two rival states of Pinya and Sagaing. Central Burma would not be reunified until the rise of Ava five decades later.

History

First Mongol invasion (1277–87)

The origins of the Myinsaing period can be traced back to the late Pagan period. By the 1270s, the Pagan Dynasty, which had ruled the Irrawaddy valley and its periphery for over two centuries, was on its last legs. Between one and two-thirds of Upper Burma's cultivatable land had been donated to religion, and the crown had lost resources needed to retain the loyalty of courtiers and military servicemen. The beginning of the end of Pagan came in 1277 when the Mongol Empire first invaded northernmost Pagan territories (present-day Dehong and Baoshan prefectures, Yunnan). The Mongols proceeded to invade northern Burma in 1283–85, occupying down to Tagaung. King Narathihapate fled to Lower Burma. In the next two years, while the king negotiated a ceasefire and eventually a surrender with the Mongols, the defence of central Burma passed to the army led by three brothers named Athinkhaya, Yazathingyan and Thihathu from Myinsaing.

Post-war rise (1287–97)
On 1 July 1287, the newly minted Mongol vassal Narathihapate was assassinated by one of his sons. All the regions in the country, which had not already revolted, broke away. The Mongols invaded central Burma to reinstate their vassal state but were driven back by the brothers' small but disciplined army. Without a king on the Pagan throne, the brothers were now the de facto leaders of central Burma. It was only in May 1289 that one of Narathihapate's sons Kyawswa emerged as king. But Kyawswa, the former viceroy of Dala (modern Yangon), had no power base in the upcountry, and controlled little outside of Pagan.

Kyawswa tried to make the best of the situation. To win their loyalty, the king appointed the three brothers viceroys of Myinsaing, Mekkhaya and Pinle. The appointments made little impression. According to an inscription dated 16 February 1293, the brothers claimed that they were the ones who defeated the Mongol invaders, and that they were equal to the king of Pagan. Nonetheless, they agreed to march to Lower Burma when King Wareru of Martaban (Mottama) became a vassal of Sukhothai. Their army attacked Martaban in 1295–96 (also reported as 1293–94) but were driven back. Still, it left no doubt as to who held the real power in central Burma.

Takeover (1297)
The brothers further consolidated power in the following years. The youngest brother, Thihathu, was the most ambitious and blatant. He was not satisfied with a mere viceroy title; he assumed the royal titles of hsinbyushin ("Lord of the White Elephant") in 1295 and mingyi ("Great King") in 1296. Alarmed, Kyawswa finally decided to seek protection of the Mongols. In January 1297, he sent his eldest son Theingapati to Tagaung, and offered submission. On 20 March 1297, Emperor Temür Khan recognised Kyawswa as King of Burma and conferred titles on the brothers as Kyawswa's subordinates. The brothers resented the new arrangement, and eventually decided to risk a Mongol intervention. With the help of the dowager queen Pwa Saw, they overthrew Kyawswa on 17 December 1297.

Second Mongol invasion (1300–01)

The brothers now braced for a Mongol reprisal. But the expected response did not come. The Mongols learned of the overthrow only in June–July 1298 but the Yunnan government, which did not have sufficient troops to undertake an invasion, took no action. By May 1299, the brothers were reasonably confident that the invasion, if at all, would not come until the next dry-season at the earliest. They allowed their puppet king Saw Hnit to receive his first audience on 8 May 1299, and more importantly, executed Kyawswa and Theingapati on 10 May 1299. The Mongols still took no action, ignoring the execution of their vassal king and crown prince. The brothers became bolder, and decided to challenge the Mongol rule in northern Burma itself. In January 1300, the Burmese army led by Athinkhaya seized lightly manned southernmost Mongol garrisons in Singu and Male, only 70 km from Tagaung.

The Mongol government could not ignore the situation any more. On 22 June 1300, the emperor declared Kumara Kassapa, a son of Kyawswa, the rightful king of Burma, and ordered an invasion. In the following dry season, a 12,000-strong Mongol army invaded, and despite taking heavy losses managed to reach Myinsaing on 25 January 1301. But Myinsaing's defences held, and the Mongols were persuaded to call off the attack on receipt of a considerable bribe on 6 April 1301. The Mongol government was dissatisfied with the outcome but pursued no further action. They withdrew from northern Burma entirely on 4 April 1303.

Dry zone power
Myinsaing was now the undisputed power in central dry zone of the country. At Pagan, Saw Hnit remained as "king" but in reality, he was now a mere governor. In the north, the brothers took over Tagaung but could not go any farther north as several Shan states now dominated the entire arc surrounding the Irrawaddy valley. In the south, they gained nominal allegiance of the rulers of Prome (Pyay) and Toungoo (Taungoo). They did not attempt to recover Lower Burma, which was now Ramanya, the coastal kingdom founded by the ethnic Mons.

The triumvirate's rule lasted for a few more years in spite of Thihathu's ambitions. The youngest brother assumed a royal title in 1306, and proclaimed himself king on 20 October 1309. The proclamation ended the charade of Saw Hnit's nominal status as king. While it is not known what the two elder brothers made of the proclamation, after Athinkhaya's death in 1310, Thihathu emerged as the primary leader of central Burma. Yazathingyan faded into the background, and died two years later.

The undisputed reign lasted about three years. In 1315, Thihathu's eldest biological son Saw Yun set up a rival base in Sagaing. By 1317, Saw Yun had survived two attacks by his father's forces, and the central dry zone was again divided: the Sagaing Kingdom in the north and the Pinya Kingdom in the south.

Government
The Myinsaing government was headed by the triumvirate. Although Myinsaing, Mekkhaya and Pinle were all capitals, judging by where they chose to defend against the Mongols, their hometown of Myinsaing appeared to have been the most important one. Like the Pagan government, the Myinsaing government relied on its vassal rulers for the governance of the peripheral regions. The key vassal rulers were:

The political unity the brothers achieved in central Burma was fragile and did not last long in any case. The kingdom split into two in 1315. Central Burma would not be reunited until five decades later (1364–67).

Economy
Myinsaing was primarily an agrarian economy. Unlike Pagan, it possessed no coastal ports, and could not conduct any maritime trade. The brothers tried to rebuild the dry zone's agrarian base. First, after the evacuation of Mongols in 1303, the brothers were able to bring all three main granaries of the country, Kyuakse, Minbu and Mu, under their rule. Secondly, they attempted to tackle the problem they inherited from Pagan kings: too much valuable land was donated to religion, and the crown could not collect revenue. They followed the tactic first used by King Kyaswa (r. 1235–51), which checked the accuracy of the donation records of the lands. To be sure, they could not solve the problem overnight. Six decades later, King Thado Minbya, a great grandson of Thihathu, would still be dealing with the issue.

Legacy
Myinsaing was the first central Burmese polity that arose out of the ashes of the fallen Pagan Empire. Its main legacies were keeping middle Burma independent, and preserving Pagan's cultural traditions. Unlike elsewhere in mainland Southeast Asia, the Tai-Shan peoples and languages did not come to dominate central Burma. The brothers, who might have been half-Shan, nonetheless saw themselves as the heirs of Pagan kings, propagated Pagan's cultural traditions, and rebuilt a state, albeit a fragile one, stretching from Tagaung in the north to Prome to the south. The fragile state would break up soon after but the Ava Kingdom, which would reunify the middle country in the 1360s, had its origins in Myinsaing.

Historiography

Chronicle reporting differences
Various royal chronicles report a generally similar outline of events but a number of differences also exist. Contemporary inscriptions show that the birth order and death order of the brothers given in the Yazawin Thit chronicle are both correct while other chronicles contain errors.

Colonial era scholarship
According to the British colonial era scholarship, this was the Age of the Three Shan Brothers, modifying the term used in the chronicles (lit. "Age of the Three Royal Brothers"). The colonial scholarship says it was the start of the Shan period in Upper Burma that would last to the mid-16th century. The assessment of the ethnicity of the brothers as Shan was first made by the British historian Arthur Purves Phayre in the late 19th century, and his assertion was propagated by later Burma historians. Phayre deemed Theinkha Bo, the father of the brothers, an ethnic Shan since the chronicles say he was a son of sawbwa of Binnaka. But the historian Michael Aung-Thwin has rejected the assertion, given that no historical evidence of any kind exists to support the claim.

Notes

References

Bibliography
 
 
 
 
 
 
 
 
 
 
 
 
 

Former countries in Burmese history
Former kingdoms
Burmese monarchy
13th century in Burma
14th century in Burma
States and territories established in 1297
States and territories disestablished in the 1310s
1297 establishments in Asia
1310s disestablishments in Asia